The 36th Cannes Film Festival was held from 7 to 19 May 1983. The Palme d'Or went to the Narayama Bushiko by Shōhei Imamura.

In 1983, the new building for the main events of the festival, the Palais des Festivals et des Congrès, was inaugurated. Initially many described it as "a hideous concrete blockhouse", nicknaming it The Bunker.  The festival opened with The King of Comedy, directed by Martin Scorsese and closed with WarGames, directed by John Badham.

Juries

Main competition
The following people were appointed as the Jury of the 1983 feature film competition:
William Styron (USA) Jury President
Henri Alekan (France)
Yvonne Baby (France) (journalist)
Sergei Bondarchuk (Soviet Union)
Youssef Chahine (Egypt)
Souleymane Cissé (Mali)
Gilbert de Goldschmidt (France)
Mariangela Melato (Italy)
Karel Reisz (UK)
Lia Van Leer (Israel) (cinematheque official)

Camera d'Or
The following people were appointed as the Jury of the 1983 Camera d'Or:
Philippe Carcassonne (France)
Dan Fainaru (Israel)
Monique Grégoire (France)
Alexis Grivas (Mexico)
Adrienne Hancia (USA)
Bernard Jubard (France)
Jean-Daniel Simon (France)

Official selection

In competition - Feature film
The following feature films competed for the Palme d'Or:

L'Argent by Robert Bresson
The Ballad of Narayama by Shohei Imamura
Carmen by Carlos Saura
Cross Creek by Martin Ritt
The Death of Mario Ricci (La mort de Mario Ricci) by Claude Goretta
Duvar by Yılmaz Güney
Eréndira by Ruy Guerra
Forbidden Relations (Visszaesők) by Zsolt Kézdi-Kovács
Heat and Dust by James Ivory
The King of Comedy by Martin Scorsese
Kharij by Mrinal Sen
Merry Christmas, Mr. Lawrence by Nagisa Oshima
Monty Python's The Meaning of Life by Terry Jones
Moon in the Gutter (La Lune dans le caniveau) by Jean-Jacques Beineix
Nostalghia by Andrei Tarkovsky
One Deadly Summer (L'été meurtrier) by Jean Becker
The South (El Sur) by Víctor Erice
Station for Two (Vokzal dlya dvoikh) by Eldar Ryazanov
The Story of Piera (Storia di Piera) by Marco Ferreri
Tender Mercies by Bruce Beresford
The Wounded Man (L'Homme blessé) by Patrice Chéreau
The Year of Living Dangerously by Peter Weir

Un Certain Regard
The following films were selected for the competition of Un Certain Regard:

 Bella Donna by Peter Keglevic
 La bête lumineuse by Pierre Perrault
 Caballo salvaje by Joaquín Cortés
 Can She Bake a Cherry Pie? by Henry Jaglom
 Le certificat d'indigence by Moussa Bathily
 The Eighties (Les Années 80) by Chantal Akerman
 The Haircut by Tamar Simon Hoffs
 The Herdsman (Mu Ma Ren) by Xie Jin
 La matiouette ou l'arrière-pays by André Téchiné
 Nešto između by Srđan Karanović
 News Items (Faits divers) by Raymond Depardon
 The Pool Hustlers (Io, Chiara e lo scuro) by Maurizio Ponzi
 Twenty Years of African Cinema (Caméra d'Afrique) by Férid Boughedir
 Ulysse by Agnès Varda
 Zappa by Bille August

Films out of competition
The following films were selected to be screened out of competition:

 Angelo My Love by Robert Duvall
 Boat People by Ann Hui
 Walking, Walking (Cammina, cammina) by Ermanno Olmi
 Équateur by Serge Gainsbourg
 Holtpont by Ferenc Rofusz
 The Man in the Silk Hat (L'homme au chapeau de soie) by Maud Linder
 Modori River (Modori-gawa) by Tatsumi Kumashiro
 Streamers by Robert Altman
 The Hunger by Tony Scott
 The Wicked Lady by Michael Winner
 Utu by Geoff Murphy
 WarGames by John Badham

Short film competition
The following short films competed for the Short Film Palme d'Or:

Ad astra by Ferenc Cakó
Un Arrivo by Dominique De Fazio
The Butterfly by Dieter Müller
Don Kichot by Krzysztof Raynoch
L'Égout  by Maria Eugenia Santos
La Fonte de Barlaeus by Pierre-Henry Salfati
Haast een hand by Gerrit van Dijk, Jacques Overtoom, Peter Sweenen
Je sais que j'ai tort mais demandez à mes copains ils disent la même chose by Pierre Levy
The Only Forgotten Take of Casablanca by Charly Weller
Too Much Oregano by Kerry Feltham

Parallel sections

International Critics' Week
The following feature films were screened for the 22nd International Critics' Week (22e Semaine de la Critique):

 Betrayal (Løperjenten) by Vibeke Lokkeberg (Norway)
 Carnival in the Night (Yami no kānibaru) by Masashi Yamamoto (Japan)
 Le Destin de Juliette by Aline Issermann (France)
 Faux fuyants by Alain Bergala, Jean-Pierre Limosin (France)
 Lianna by John Sayles (United States)
 Menuet by Lili Rademakers (Belgium, Netherlands)
 The Princess (Adj király katonát) by Pal Erdöss (Hungary)

Directors' Fortnight
The following films were screened for the 1983 Directors' Fortnight (Quinzaine des Réalizateurs):

 Anguelos by Georges Katakouzinos
 Another Time, Another Place by Michael Radford
 Barbarosa by Fred Schepisi
 The Stationmaster's Wife (Bolwieser) by Rainer Werner Fassbinder
 The Compass Rose (La rosa de los vientos) by Patricio Guzman
 Daniel Takes a Train (Szerencsés Dániel) by Pal Sandor
 Dead End Street by Yaky Yosha
 Demons in the Garden (Demonios en el jardín) by Manuel Gutierrez Aragon
  (Eisenhans) by Tankred Dorst
 Grenzenlos by Josef Rödl
 The House of the Yellow Carpet (La casa del tappeto giallo) by Carlo Lizzani
 Just a Game (Rien qu'un jeu) by Brigitte Sauriol
 Last Days of the Victim (Últimos días de la víctima) by Adolfo Aristarain
 Local Hero by Bill Forsyth
 Miss Lonelyhearts by Michael Dinner (Brief mention in novel)
 No Trace of Sin (Sem Sombra De Pecado) by José Fonseca e Costa
 La rue étroite (Xiao Jie) by Yang Yanjin
 Rupture (al-Inquita - Breakdown) by Mohamed Chouikh
 A Woman in Flames (Die flambierte Frau) by Robert van Ackeren

Short films

 Alchimie by Michèle Miron, Richard Clark
 Conte Obscur by Manuel Gómez
 Dédicace by Marie Brazeau
 The Life And Death of Joe Soap by Lewis John Cooper
 Phalloctere by Manuel Gómez
 Saudade by Carlos Porto de Andrade Jr, Leonardo Crescenti Neto

Awards

Official awards
The following films and people received the 1983 Official selection awards:
Palme d'Or: The Ballad of Narayama (Narayama Bushiko) by Shōhei Imamura
Grand Prix: Monty Python's The Meaning of Life by Terry Jones
Best Director (Grand prix du cinéma de création): 
Robert Bresson for L'Argent 
 Andrei Tarkovsky for Nostalghia
Best Actress: Hanna Schygulla for The Story of Piera
Best Actor: Gian Maria Volonté for The Death of Mario Ricci
Best Artistic Contribution: Carmen by Carlos Saura
Jury Prize: Kharij by Mrinal Sen
Golden Camera
Caméra d'Or: The Princess by Pál Erdöss
Short films
Short Film Palme d'Or: Je sais que j'ai tort mais demandez à mes copains ils disent la même chose by Pierre Levy
Jury Prize - Best Short Film: The Only Forgotten Take of Casablanca by Charly Weller & Too Much Oregano by Kerry Feltham

Independent awards
FIPRESCI Prizes
Nostalghia by Andrei Tarkovsky (In competition)
Daniel Takes a Train (Szerencsés Dániel) by Pál Sándor (Directors' Fortnight)
Commission Supérieure Technique
 Technical Grand Prize: Carmen by Carlos Saura
Ecumenical Jury
 Prize of the Ecumenical Jury: Nostalghia by Andrei Tarkovsky
Award of the Youth
Foreign Film: Miss Lonelyhearts by Michael Dinner

References

Media
 INA: Opening of the 1983 Festival (commentary in French)
 INA: Directors' Fortnight, 1983 (commentary in French)
 INA: Closing evening of the 1983 festival (commentary in French)

External links 
1983 Cannes Film Festival (web.archive)
Official website Retrospective 1983
Cannes Film Festival Awards for 1983 at Internet Movie Database

Cannes Film Festival
Cannes Film Festival
Cannes Film Festival
Cannes